Ruperto Herrera Tabio (born December 6, 1949 in Havana) is a former basketball player from Cuba. At a height of 2.00 m (6'6 ") tall, and a weight of 95 kg (210 lbs.), he played at the shooting guard and small forward positions. He received the FIBA Order of Merit in 1999, and he became a FIBA Hall of Fame player, in 2015. He was awarded with the Olympic Order, in 2019.

Club career
Herrera was a nine-time champion of the top-tier level Cuban league, in the years 1964, 1965, 1966, 1967, 1968, 1969, 1971, 1973, and 1975.

National team career
Herrera was a long-time member of the senior men's Cuban national basketball team. With Cuba's senior national team, he played at four Summer Olympic Games, as he played at Mexico 1968, Munich 1972, Montreal 1976, and Moscow 1980. He also played at two FIBA World Cups, playing at Yugoslavia 1970, and Puerto Rico 1974.

With Cuba, he won the bronze medal at the 1971 Pan American Games. He also won the bronze medal at the 1972 Summer Olympic Games, which were held in Munich, West Germany.

References

External links
FIBA Hall of Fame profile
FIBA.com profile (archive)

1949 births
Living people
Basketball players at the 1968 Summer Olympics
Basketball players at the 1971 Pan American Games
Basketball players at the 1972 Summer Olympics
Basketball players at the 1976 Summer Olympics
Basketball players at the 1980 Summer Olympics
Cuban men's basketball players
1970 FIBA World Championship players
1974 FIBA World Championship players
FIBA Hall of Fame inductees
Medalists at the 1972 Summer Olympics
Olympic basketball players of Cuba
Olympic bronze medalists for Cuba
Olympic medalists in basketball
Pan American Games bronze medalists for Cuba
Pan American Games medalists in basketball
Shooting guards
Small forwards
Basketball players from Havana
Universiade medalists in basketball
Universiade bronze medalists for Cuba
Medalists at the 1970 Summer Universiade
Medalists at the 1971 Pan American Games